The 2012 Campeonato Alagoano de Futebol was the 82nd season of Alagoas's top professional football league. The competition began on January 14 and ended on May 12. CRB won the championship for the 26th time, while Associação Atlética Coruripe and Penedense were relegated.

Format
The tournament consists of a double round-robin format, in which all twelve teams play each other twice, with classification split in two stages. Each round counts as one stage. The four better-placed teams of each stage will face themselves in playoffs matches, and the first stage champion will face the second stage champion. If the same team win both stages, it will be considered the champion.

The bottom two teams on overall classification will be relegated.

Participating teams

First round (first stage)

Standings

Results

Semifinals

First leg

Second leg

ASA won 6-1 on aggregated

CRB won 6-1 on aggregated

Finals

First leg

Second leg

Second round (second stage)

Standings

Results

Semifinals

First leg

Second leg

CSA won 3-2 on aggregated

ASA won 6-3 on aggregated

Finals

First leg

Second leg

Championship finals

First leg

Second leg

Overall classification

References

External links
 Official site

Alagoano
Campeonato Alagoano